is a Japan-exclusive video game created by General Support which was originally released for the NEC PC-9801, and later ported for the Super Famicom.

The Super Famicom version of the game would become the prequel to Koutetsu no Kishi 2: Sabaku no Rommel Shougun and Koutetsu no Kishi 3: Gekitotsu Europe Sensen. There was an expansion pack for the original NEC PC-9801 version titled ; which added a new scenario.

Summary

The player controls German Waffen-SS and Heer officer who was responsible for commanding troops in major World War II operations like Operation Barbarossa (which are included in the game). Before each mission, a basic summary is given in Japanese in addition to unit strengths, and the locations of major cities.

Players must assign starting locations for all of their units and must seek out the AI opponent, which has placed its units according to their historical starting locations. Each mission has the player either invade the enemy, withdraw from an untenable position, or defend occupied territory. The rate of accuracy in combat is entirely dependent on the distance between the opponents along with a degree of luck (to determine whether the bullet penetrates the target for a hit or not). The concept of endurance is completely absent for all units in this game.

Players have access to in-mission help and the option menu. Attack, defense, and speed statistics are covered for each unit. Like in real history, the game ends after the player is scripted to lose the Battle of Moscow, which saw nearly 1.6 million casualties on both sides of the battle. The player is given a brief message by a man in a motorcycle, then a game over screen appears. The timespan of the Super Famicom version of the game is from June 1941 to September 1943; approximately the duration of Nazi Germany's forward offensive moment in the Eastern Front of World War II. However, the NEC PC-9801 version of the game extends the timespan to March 1945, when the player has to defend the Third Reich from the invading Anglo-American forces.

See also
SNES Mouse
List of World War II video games
Barbarossa - a closely related video game; also for the Super Famicom

References

External links
Koutetsu no Kishi at NEC PC-9801 Data Base
Koutetsu no Kishi Scenario at NEC PC-9801 Data Base

1991 video games
Asmik Ace Entertainment games
General Support games
Japan-exclusive video games
Koutetsu no Kishi series
NEC PC-9801 games
Super Nintendo Entertainment System games
Top-down video games
Video games developed in Japan
Video games scored by Akihiko Mori
World War II video games